The Kaech'ŏn Line is an electrified standard-gauge secondary line of the Korean State Railway running from Sinanju on the P'yŏngŭi Line to Kaech'ŏn on the Manp'o Line.

History
The line was originally opened on 13 May 1916 by the Mitsui Mining Railway as a  narrow-gauge line running from Sinanju to Kaech'ŏn. It was subsequently extended from Kaech'ŏn to Ch'ŏndong, with the new section being opened on 1 December 1918. In 1927, the company was renamed Kaech'ŏn Light Railway, and then was leased to the Chosen Government Railway (Sentetsu) on 1 November 1932. Sentetsu began converting the Kaech'ŏn–Ch'ŏndong section to standard gauge, completing this work on 15 July 1933, and on 1 September 1933 the entirety of the line was officially absorbed into Sentetsu, with the Kaech'ŏn–Ch'ŏndong section becoming part of the Manp'o Line. After the partition of Korea the line was located in North Korea and became part of the Korean State Railway, which converted the remaining narrow-gauge section (Sinanju–Kaech'ŏn) to standard gauge in 1949; the regauging work began in March 1949 and was completed in eight months.

Electrification of the line was completed in February 1979, and semi-automatic train control was installed on the entirety of the line at the same time.

Services
Anthracite and cement are the primary commodities shipped on the line.

The following passenger trains are known to operate on this line:

 Express trains 19/20, operating between P'yŏngyang and Hŭich'ŏn Ch'ŏngnyŏn, run on this line between Sinanju Ch'ŏngnyŏn and Kaech'ŏn;
 Semi-express trains 124-125/126-127, operating between Sinŭiju Ch'ŏngnyŏn and Ch'ŏngjin Ch'ŏngnyŏn, run on this line between Sinanju Ch'ŏngnyŏn and Kaech'ŏn;
 Local trains 250-251/252-253, operating between Sinŭiju Ch'ŏngnyŏn and Hŭich'ŏn Ch'ŏngnyŏn, run on this line between Sinanju Ch'ŏngnyŏn and Kaech'ŏn.

There are also commuter trains running along the line between Sinanju Ch'ŏngnyŏn and Kaech'ŏn.

Route
A yellow background in the "Distance" box indicates that section of the line is not electrified

References

 

Railway lines in North Korea
Standard gauge railways in North Korea